Giosuè Carducci was one of four s built for the  (Royal Italian Navy) in the mid-1930s and early 1940s. Completed in 1937, she served in World War II.

Design and description
The Oriani-class destroyers were slightly improved versions of the preceding . Their complement during wartime was 206 officers and enlisted men.

The Orianis were powered by two Parsons geared steam turbines, each driving one propeller shaft using steam supplied by three Thornycroft boilers.

Their main battery consisted of four 50-caliber  guns in two twin-gun turrets, one each fore and aft of the superstructure. Amidships were a pair of 15-caliber 120-millimeter star shell guns. Anti-aircraft (AA) defense for the Oriani-class ships was provided by four  machine guns. The ships were equipped with six  torpedo tubes in two triple mounts amidships. Although they were not provided with a sonar system for anti-submarine work, they were fitted with a pair of depth charge throwers. The ships could carry 56 mines.

Citations

Bibliography

External links
 Giosuè Carducci Marina Militare website

Oriani-class destroyers
Ships built in Livorno
1936 ships
World War II destroyers of Italy
Maritime incidents in March 1941